Solomon Andrews may refer to:

Solomon Andrews (businessman) (1835–1908), British entrepreneur
Solomon Andrews (inventor) (1806–1872), American physician, aviator and dirigible airship inventor